Bread Street Kitchen is a restaurant owned by chef Gordon Ramsay within the One New Change retail and office development in London.

History
The restaurant cost £3 million, and the opening was delayed by a year and was subsequently expected to open on 26 September 2011. A week prior to that date, Gordon Ramsay posted on Twitter, "Holy Cr*p 1 week to go! Not to sure if we are going to make it on time." It actually opened on 26 October, located near St Paul's Cathedral in London, inside the One New Change retail and office development across two floors. It is next door to one of Jamie Oliver's Barbecoa restaurants. The interior of the restaurant was fitted out by Russell Sage Studios using reclaimed materials and exposed concrete struts.

It was announced in June 2014 that Ramsay intends to replicate Bread Street Kitchen in a new restaurant in Hong Kong, due to open in the following September. 
On 23 June 2015 Gordon Ramsay officially opened Bread Street Kitchen in Singapore, at Marina Bay Sands. This marks his first foray into Asia. On 4 June 2015 Gordon Ramsay announced he will be opening Bread Street Kitchen in Atlantis, The Palm Dubai during the autumn of 2015.

After spending three years in Lan Kwai Fong, Bread Street Kitchen Hong Kong has moved into a prime real-estate space atop The Peak at The Peak Galleria in February 2019.

Menu
The restaurant is fitted out with an open kitchen, a raw bar and a wood-burning oven. It has a wine balcony storing 2000 bottles. Dishes on the menu include a burger made of beef short ribs, a mutton pie, as well as suckling pig.

Reception
Food critic Jay Rayner visited the restaurant for The Observer in October 2011. He described it as "loud and brash", but enjoyed several dishes such as a sea bass with aubergine purée, and a veal chop which he thought could have been improved by resting it longer. But he thought that the tamarind chicken wings were overpriced and of poor quality, the burger on the menu was "overminced to a paste, destroying both flavour and texture". He felt that the restaurant might improve with time. Tracey MacLeod said that "nearly everything ... was good" in her review in The Independent. She liked the burger and suggested that that mutton pie was going to become the restaurant's signature dish. She found that her waitress wasn't as familiar with the menu as she would have liked, and that the service was very slow.

The review in Metro gave the restaurant three out of five, but said that this was based on the interior and not the food. It said that the veal chop was "weirdly truncated and misshapen, as though it had a slab shaved off to appease the bottom line" and the crab tagliolini was "cat food". However, it did praise the chicken wings and the venison with sour cherries and celeriac purée.

Time Out magazine gave the restaurant a rating of four out of five, however Harden's restaurant guide gave it a score of four (where 1 is high and five is low) for food, ambience and service and said that it was "nothing special". Tanya Gold visited the restaurant nine months after it opened for The Spectator, saying that the service was fast and remarked positively about the food she tried.

See also

Bread Street Kitchen, Singapore

References

External links

2011 establishments in England
2011 in London
Restaurants established in 2011
Restaurants in London